Richard Mlokothwa Masemola  was an Anglican priest in South Africa in the second half of the 20th century. He was born on 17 February 1921 in KwaZulu Natal or Zululand as it was then known. Masemola was the fourth-born of eleven children born to Molatudi Frank and Rhoda Mphangose Masemola. 

Masemola was educated at Marrianhill, St. Peter's College, Rosettenville as well as UNISA. He was ordained in 1961. At first he served in Hilton at a small church. Later he served at St Martin's Anglican Church in Edendale, a suburb of Pietermaritzburg in KwaZulu Natal, eventually becoming an Arch Deacon.

Father Masemola met and married teacher Emelda Themba Ngubane (b. 1927). They had five children; four sons and a daughter. They eventually settled in Caluza, a semi-rural suburb of Pietermaritzburg.

Father Masemola passed away at Edendale hospital on 20 November 1981. He left behind his wife Emelda Themba, four sons - Wiseman, Thamsanqa, Sibusiso and Thabo - a daughter Millicent, two daughters-in-law and six grandchildren.

References

Archdeacons of Maritzburg
20th-century South African Anglican priests
People educated at St Peter’s College, Rosettenville